Terra Alta Bank, also known as The History House, is a historic bank building located at Terra Alta, Preston County, West Virginia. It was built in 1893, and is a three-story, six bay wide brick Italianate style commercial building. It has a cast iron storefront on the first floor of the main facade and metal window surrounds on the upper floors.  The roof line of the building has a decorative bracketed cast iron cornice on three sides. The bank occupied the building until 1991, after which it was partly occupied by a local historical society.

It was listed on the National Register of Historic Places in 1997.

References

External links
The History House website

History museums in West Virginia
Bank buildings on the National Register of Historic Places in West Virginia
Italianate architecture in West Virginia
Commercial buildings completed in 1893
Buildings and structures in Preston County, West Virginia
Museums in Preston County, West Virginia
National Register of Historic Places in Preston County, West Virginia